Jacek Kuranty (born February 6, 1978 in Tarnobrzeg) is a Polish footballer who currently plays for Siarka Tarnobrzeg. He was a popular player in Poland.

Career
Kuranty previously played for Siarka Tarnobrzeg, GKS Bełchatów, Odra Wodzisław Śląski, and Polonia Bytom.

Notes
 

Polish footballers
Siarka Tarnobrzeg players
GKS Bełchatów players
Polonia Bytom players
1978 births
Living people
People from Tarnobrzeg
Sportspeople from Podkarpackie Voivodeship
Association football midfielders